Pam Pabanzin may refer to:
 Pam Pabanzin, Sistan and Baluchestan